Taraconica aurea is a species of moth of the family Erebidae. It is found in Southern Madagascar.

The wingspan of the adult moths is 21–22 mm.

References

Boletobiinae
Moths described in 1968
Moths of Madagascar